Khosrowabad (also Romanized as Khosrowābād; also known as Khosrava and Khoskawa) is a village in Zulachay Rural District, in the Central District of Salmas County, West Azerbaijan Province, Iran. At the 2006 census, its population was 158, in 44 families.

See also
 Assyrians in Iran
 List of Assyrian settlements

References 

Populated places in Salmas County
Assyrian settlements